Durgapura railway station is a railway station on the North Western Railways network in the state of Rajasthan, India. It is located approximately 8 km from Jaipur railway station.

The station was ranked third in the Swachh Rail, Swachh Bharat 2019 survey about cleanliness of railway stations.

Various trains passing

Some of the important trains that pass through Durgapura are :

See also
 Jaipur district

References

Railway stations in Jaipur
Railway stations in Jaipur district
Jaipur railway division